Masonville is an unincorporated community in Grant County, West Virginia, United States. Its post office is closed. It was also known as Spring Gap.

References

Unincorporated communities in Grant County, West Virginia
Unincorporated communities in West Virginia